Caradjaina is a genus of moths of the family Crambidae. It contains only one species, Caradjaina kwangtungialis, which is found in China (Guangdong).

References

Scopariinae
Crambidae genera